There are about 469 genera of cicadas in the family Cicadidae.

 Abagazara Distant, 1905 c g
 Abricta Stål, 1866 c g
 Abroma Stål, 1866 i c g
 Aceropyga Duffels, 1977 c g
 Acuticephala Torres, 1958 i c g
 Acyroneura Torres, 1958 i c g
 Adelia Moulds, 2012 c g
 Adeniana Distant, 1906 c g
 Aedeastria de Boer, 1990 c g
 Aestuansella Boulard, 1981 c g
 Aetanna Lee, 2014 c g
 Afzeliada Boulard, 1973 c g
 Ahomana Distant, 1905 i c g
 Akamba Distant, 1905 c g
 Alarcta Torres, 1958 i c g
 Albanycada Villet, 1989 c g
 Aleeta Moulds, 2003 c g
 Allobroma Duffels, 2011 c g
 Ambragaeana Chou & Yao, 1985 c g
 Amphipsalta Fleming, 1969 c g
 Anapsaltoda Ashton, 1921 c g
 Angamiana Distant, 1890 c g
 Anopercalna Boulard, 2008 c g
 Antankaria Distant, 1904 c g
 Aola Distant, 1905
 Aragualna Champanhet, Boulard and Gaiani, 2000 i c g
 Arcystasia Distant, 1882 c g
 Arenopsaltria Ashton, 1921 c g
 Arfaka Distant, 1905 c g
 Ariasa Distant, 1905 i c g
 Arunta Distant, 1904 c g
 Atrapsalta Owen & Moulds, 2016 c g
 Attenuella Boulard, 1973 c g
 Auritibicen Lee, 2015 c g
 Auscala Moulds, 2012 c g
 Auta Distant, 1897 c g
 Ayesha Distant, 1905 c g
 Ayuthia Distant, 1919 c g
 Azanicada Villet, 1989 c g
 Babras Jacobi, 1907 i c g
 Baeturia Stål, 1866 c g
 Bafutalna Boulard, 1993 c g
 Balinta Distant, 1905 c g
 Basa Distant, 1905 c g
 Bavea Distant, 1905 c g
 Beameria Davis, 1934 i c g b
 Becquartina Kato, 1940 c g
 Berberigetta Costa, Nunes, Marabuto, Mendes & Simões, 2017 c g
 Bergalna Boulard & Martinelli, 1996 i c g
 Bijaurana Distant, 1912 c g
 Birrima Distant, 1906 c g
 Bispinalta Delorme, 2017 c g
 Biura Lee & Sanborn, 2015 c g
 Borencona Davis, 1928 i c g
 Brachylobopyga Duffels, 1982 c g
 Brevisiana Boulard, 1973 c g
 Burbunga Distant, 1905 c g
 Buyisa Distant, 1907 c g
 Cabecita Lee, 2014 c g
 Cacama Distant, 1904 i c g b (cactus dodgers)
 Calcagninus Distant, 1889 c g
 Caledopsalta Delorme & In Press c g
 Caliginopsalta Ewart, 2005 c g
 Calliopsida Torres, 1958 i c g
 Callogaeana Chou & Yao, 1985 c g
 Calopsaltria Stål, 1862 c g
 Calyria Stål, 1862 i c g
 Canualna Boulard, 1985 c g
 Capcicada Villet, 1989 c g
 Carineta Amyot and Serville, 1843 i c g
 Cephalalna Boulard, 2006 c g
 Chalumalna Boulard, 1998 i c g
 Champaka Distant, 1905 c g
 Changa Lee, 2016 c g
 Chelapsalta Moulds, 2012 c g
 Chilecicada Sanborn, 2014 c g
 Chinaria Davis, 1934 i c g
 Chlorocysta Westwood, 1851 c g
 Chloropsalta Haupt, 1920 c g
 Chonosia Distant, 1905 i c g
 Chremistica Stål, 1870 c g
 Chrysocicada Boulard, 1989 c g
 Chrysolasia Moulds, 2003 i c g
 Cicada Linnaeus, 1758 i c g
 Cicadatra Kolenati, 1857 c g
 Cicadetta Kolenati, 1857 i c g b  (small grass cicadas)
 Cicadettana Marshall & Hill, 2017 c g
 Cicadmalleus Boulard & Puissant, 2013 c g
 Clidophleps Van Duzee, 1915 i c g
 Clinata Moulds, 2012 c g
 Clinopsalta Moulds, 2012 c g
 Coata Distant, 1906 i c g
 Cochleopsaltria Pham & Constant, 2017
 Conibosa Distant, 1905 i c g
 Cornuplura Davis, 1944 i c g b
 Cosmopsaltria Stål, 1866 c g
 Cracenpsaltria Sanborn, 2016 c g
 Crassisternalna Boulard, 1980 c g
 Crassopsaltria Boulard, 2008 c g
 Crotopsalta Ewart, 2005 c g
 Cryptotympana Stål, 1862 c g
 Curvicicada Chou & Lu, 1997 c g
 Cyclochila Amyot & Serville, 1843 c g
 Cystopsaltria Goding & Froggatt, 1904 c g
 Cystosoma Westwood, 1842 c g
 Davispia Cooper, 1941 c g
 Daza Distant, 1905 i c g
 Decebalus Distant, 1920 c g
 Derotettix Berg, 1882 i c g
 Diceroprocta Stål, 1870 i c g b (scrub cicadas)
 Diceropyga Stål, 1870 c g
 Diemeniana Distant, 1906 c g
 Dilobopyga Duffels, 1977 c g
 Dimissalna Boulard, 2007 c g
 Dinarobia Mamet, 1957 c g
 Dipsopsalta Moulds, 2012 c g
 Distantada Orian, 1964 c g
 Distantalna Boulard, 2009 c g
 Dorachosa Distant, 1892 i c g
 Dorisiana Metcalf, 1952 i c g
 Drymopsalta Ewart, 2005 c g
 Dulderana Distant, 1905 i c g
 Dundubia Amyot & Serville, 1843 c g
 Durangona Distant, 1911 i c g
 Elachysoma Torres, 1964 i c g
 Elassoneura Torres, 1964 i c g
 Emathia Stål, 1866 c g
 Erempsalta Moulds, 2012 c g
 Esada Boulard, 1973 c g
 Euboeana Gogala, Trilar & Drosopoulos, 2011 c g
 Euryphara Horváth, 1912 c g
 Euterpnosia Matsumura, 1917 c g
 Euthemopsaltria Moulds, 2014 c g
 Ewartia Moulds, 2012 c g
 Falcatpsalta Owen & Moulds, 2016 c g
 Fidicina Amyot & Audinet-Serville, 1843 i c g
 Fidicinoides Boulard & Martinelli, 1996 i c g
 Fijipsalta Duffels, 1988 c g
 Formocicada Lee & Hayashi, 2004 c g
 Formosemia Matsumura, 1917 c g
 Formotosena Kato, 1925 c g
 Fractuosella Boulard, 1979 c g
 Froggattoides Distant, 1910 c g
 Gaeana Amyot & Serville, 1843 c g
 Gagatopsalta Ewart, 2005 c g
 Galanga Moulds, 2012 c g
 Galgoria Lee, 2016 c g
 Gazuma Distant, 1905 c g
 Gelidea Moulds, 2012 c g
 Germalna Delorme
 Ggomapsalta Lee, 2009 c g
 Glaucopsaltria Goding & Froggatt, 1904 c g
 Graminitigrina Ewart & Marques, 2008 c g
 Graptopsaltria Motschulsky, 1866 c g
 Graptotettix Stål, 1866 c g
 Guaranisaria Distant, 1905 i c g
 Gudaba Distant, 1906 c g
 Gudanga Distant, 1905 c g
 Guineapsaltria de Boer, 1993 c g
 Guyalna Boulard & Martinelli, 1996 i c g
 Gymnotympana Stål, 1862 c g
 Hadoa Moulds, 2015 c g b (western annual cicadas)
 Haemopsalta Owen & Moulds, 2016 c g
 Hainanosemia Kato, 1927 c g
 Hamza Distant, 1904 c g
 Haphsa Distant, 1905 c g
 Hea Distant, 1906 c g
 Heliopsalta Moulds, 2012 c g
 Hemidictya Burmeister, 1835 i c g
 Hemisciera Amyot & Audinet-Serville, 1843 i c g
 Henicopsaltria Stål, 1866 c g
 Henicotettix Stål, 1858 c g
 Herrera Distant, 1905 i c g
 Heteropsaltria Jacobi, 1902 c g
 Hilaphura Webb, 1979 c g
 Hovana Distant, 1905 c g
 Huechys Amyot & Serville, 1843 c g
 Hyalessa China, 1925 c g
 Hyantia Stål, 1866 i c g
 Hyantiini Distant, 1905: 304. n. syn i
 Hylora Boulard, 1971 c g
 Illyria Moulds, 1985 c g
 Imbabura Distant, 1911 i c g
 Inflatopyga Duffels, 1997 c g
 Inthaxara Distant, 1913 c g
 Ioba Distant, 1904 c g
 Iruana Distant, 1905 c g
 Jacatra Distant, 1905 c g
 Jafuna Distant, 1912 c g
 Jassopsaltria Ashton, 1914 c g
 Juanaria Distant, 1920 i c g
 Kageralna Boulard, 2012 c g
 Kalabita Moulton, 1923 c g
 Kamalata Distant, 1889 c g
 Kanakia Distant, 1892 c g
 Kaphsa Lee, 2012 c g
 Karenia Distant, 1888 c g
 Karscheliana Boulard, 1990 c g
 Katoa Ôuchi, 1938 c g
 Khimbya Distant, 1905 c g
 Kikihia Dugdale, 1971 c g
 Klapperichicen Dlabola, 1957 c g
 Kobonga Distant, 1906 c g
 Koma Distant, 1904 c g
 Kongota Distant, 1904 c g
 Koranna Distant, 1905 c g
 Kosemia Matsumura, 1927 c g
 Kumanga Distant, 1905 c g
 Lacetas Karsch, 1890 c g
 Lahugada Distant, 1905 c g
 Lamotialna Boulard, 1976 c g
 Lembeja Distant, 1892 c g
 Lemuriana Distant, 1905 c g
 Leptopsaltria Stål, 1866 c g
 Leptosemia Matsumura, 1917 c g
 Lethama Distant, 1905 c g
 Ligymolpa Karsch, 1890 c g
 Limnopsalta Moulds, 2012 c g
 Linguacicada Chou & Lu, 1997 c g
 Luangwana Distant, 1914 c g
 Lycurgus China, 1925 c g
 Lyristes Horváth, 1926 g
 Macrosemia Kato, 1925 c g
 Macrotristria Stål, 1870 c g
 Magicicada Davis, 1925 i c g b (periodical cicadas)
 Majeorona Distant, 1905 i c g
 Malagasia Distant, 1882 c g
 Malgachialna Boulard, 1980 c g
 Malgotilia Boulard, 1980 c g
 Malloryalna Sanborn, 2016 c g
 Manna Lee & Emery, 2013 c g
 Maoricicada Dugdale, 1971 c g
 Mapondera Distant, 1905 c g
 Mariekea De Jong & de Boer, 2004 c g
 Maroboduus Distant, 1920 c g
 Marteena Moulds, 1986 c g
 Masamia Lee & Emery, 2013 c g
 Masupha Distant, 1892 c g
 Mata Distant, 1906 c g
 Maua Distant, 1905 c g
 Megapomponia Boulard, 2005 c g
 Megatibicen Sanborn & Heath, 2016 c g b
 Meimuna Distant, 1905 c g
 Melampsalta Amyot, 1847 c g
 Melanesiana Delorme, 2017 g
 Mendozana Distant, 1906 i c g
 Minilomia Lee, 2013 c g
 Minipomponia Boulard, 2008 c g
 Miniterpnosia Lee, 2013 c g
 Mirabilopsaltria de Boer, 1996 c g
 Miranha Distant, 1905 i c g
 Moana Myers, 1928 c g
 Mogannia Amyot & Audinet-Serville, 1843 c g
 Monomatapa Distant, 1897 c g
 Mosaica Lee & Emery, 2013 c g
 Mouia Distant, 1920 c g
 Muansa Distant, 1904 c g
 Muda Distant, 1897 c g
 Mugadina Moulds, 2012 c g
 Munza Distant, 1904 c g
 Mura Distant, 1905 i c g
 Murmurillana Delorme, 2016 c g
 Murphyalna Boulard, 2012 c g
 Musimoia China, 1929 c g
 Musoda Karsch, 1890 c g
 Myersalna Boulard, 1988 c g
 Myopsalta Moulds, 2012 c g
 Nabalua Moulton, 1923 c g
 Nablistes Karsch, 1891 c g
 Nanopsalta Moulds, 2012 c g
 Nelcyndana Distant, 1906 c g
 Neocicada Kato, 1932 i c g b
 Neomuda Distant, 1920 c g
 Neoncotympana Lee, 2011 c g
 Neoplatypedia Davis, 1920 i c g
 Neopsaltoda Distant, 1910 c g
 Neopunia Moulds, 2012 c g
 Neoterpnosia Lee & Emery, 2014 c g
 Neotibicen Hill & Moulds, 2015 c g b (annual or dogday cicadas)
 Nggeliana Boulard, 1979 c g
 Nigripsaltria de Boer, 1999 c g
 Noongara Moulds, 2012 c g
 Nosola Stål, 1866 i c g
 Notopsalta Dugdale, 1971 c g
 Novemcella Goding, 1925 i c g
 Nyara Villet, 1999 c g
 Odopoea Stål, 1861 i c g
 Okanagana Distant, 1905 i c g
 Okanagodes Davis, 1919 i c g
 Oligoglena Horváth, 1912 c g
 Ollanta Distant, 1905 i c g
 Oncotympana Stål, 1870 c g
 Onomacritus Distant, 1912 c g
 Onoralna Boulard, 1996 i c g
 Orapa Distant, 1905 c g
 Orellana Distant, 1905 i c g
 Orialella Metcalf, 1952 i c g
 Orientopsaltria Kato, 1944 c g
 Oudeboschia Distant, 1920 c g
 Owra Ashton, 1912 c g
 Oxypleura Amyot & Audinet-Serville, 1843 c g
 Pacarina Distant, 1905 i c g b
 Pachypsaltria Stål, 1863 i c g
 Paectira Karsch, 1890 c g
 Pagiphora Horvath, 1912 c g
 Paharia Distant, 1905 c g
 Pakidetta Sanborn & Ahmed, 2017 c g
 Palapsalta Moulds, 2012 c g
 Panialna Delorme, 2016 c g
 Panka Distant, 1905 c g
 Papuapsaltria Boer, 1995 c g
 Paradina Moulds, 2012 c g
 Paranistria Metcalf, 1952 c g
 Paranosia Lee, 2014 c g
 Paratalainga He, 1984 c g
 Paratanna Lee, 2012 c g
 Parnisa Stål, 1862 i c g
 Parnkalla Distant, 1905 c g
 Parnquila Moulds, 2012 c g
 Parvittya Distant, 1905 c g
 Paulaudalna Delorme, 2017 c g
 Pauropsalta Goding & Froggatt, 1904 c g
 Philipsalta Lee, Marshall & Hill c g
 Physeema Moulds, 2012 c g
 Pictila Moulds, 2012 c g
 Pinheya Dlabola, 1963 c g
 Pipilopsalta Ewart, 2005 c g
 Platylomia Stål, 1870 c g
 Platypedia Uhler, 1888 i c g
 Platypleura Amyot & Audinet-Serville, 1843 c g
 Platypsalta Moulds, 2012 c g
 Plautilla Stål, 1865 i c g
 Plerapsalta Moulds, 2012 c g
 Polyneura Westwood, 1840 c g
 Pompanonia Boulard, 1982 i c g
 Pomponia Stål, 1866 c g
 Popplepsalta Owen & Moulds, 2016 c g
 Poviliana Boulard, 1997 c g
 Prasia Stål, 1863 c g
 Prasinosoma Torres, 1963 i c g
 Proarna Stål, 1864 i c g
 Procollina Metcalf, 1952 i c g
 Prosotettix Jacobi, 1907 i c g
 Prunasis Stål, 1862 i c g
 Psallodia Uhler, 1903 i c g
 Psalmocharias Kirkaldy, 1908 c g
 Psaltoda Stål, 1862 c g
 Psephenotettix Torres, 1958 i c g
 Pseudokanakia Delorme, 2016 c g
 Pseudotettigetta Puissant, 2010 c g
 Psilotympana Stål, 1862 c g
 Psithyristria Stål, 1870 c g
 Punia Moulds, 2012 c g
 Purana Distant, 1905 c g
 Puranoides Moulton, 1917 c g
 Pycna Amyot & Audinet-Serville, 1843 c g
 Pyropsalta Moulds, 2012 c g
 Quesada Distant, 1905 i c g b
 Quintilia Stål, 1866 c g
 Qurana Lee, 2009 c g
 Raiateana Boulard, 1979 c g
 Relictapsalta Owen & Moulds, 2016 c g
 Rhadinopyga Duffels, 1985 c g
 Rhinopsalta Melichar, 1908 c g
 Rhodopsalta Dugdale, 1971 c g
 Rouxalna Boulard, 1999 c g
 Rustia Stål, 1866 c g
 Sadaka Distant, 1904 c g
 Salvazana Distant, 1913 c g
 Samaecicada Popple & Emery, 2010 c g
 Sapantanga Distant, 1905 c g
 Saticula Stål, 1866 c g
 Scieroptera Stål, 1866 c g
 Scolopita Chou & Lei, 1997 c g
 Scottotympana de Boer, 1991 c g
 Sechellalna Boulard, 2010 c g
 Selymbria Stål, 1861 i c g
 Semia Matsumura, 1917 c g
 Severiana Boulard, 1973 c g
 Shaoshia Wei, Ahmed & Rizvi, 2010 c g
 Simona Moulds, 2012 c g
 Sinapsaltria Kato, 1940 c g
 Sinosemia Matsumura, 1927 c g
 Sinotympana Lee, 2009 c g
 Songga Lee, 2016 c g
 Soudaniella Boulard, 1973 c g
 Spoerryana Boulard, 1974 c g
 Stagea Villet, 1995 c g
 Stagira Stål, 1861 c g
 Stellenboschia Distant, 1920 c g
 Strepuntalna Delorme, 2017 c g
 Strumosella Boulard, 1973 c g
 Strumoseura Villet, 1999 c g
 Subpsaltria Chen, 1943 c g
 Subtibicina Lee, 2012 c g
 Suisha Kato, 1928 c g
 Sulphogaeana Chou & Yao, 1985 c g
 Sundabroma Duffels, 2011 c g
 Sylphoides Moulds, 2012 c g
 Tacua Amyot & Serville, 1843 c g
 Taipinga Distant, 1905 c g
 Taiwanosemia Matsumura, 1917 c g
 Takapsalta Matsumura, 1927 c g
 Talainga Distant, 1890 c g
 Talcopsaltria Moulds, 2008 c g
 Tamasa Distant, 1905 c g
 Tanna Distant, 1905 c g
 Taona Distant, 1909 c g
 Taphura Stål, 1862 i c g
 Taungia Ollenbach, 1928 c g
 Taurella Moulds, 2012 c g
 Telmapsalta Moulds, 2012 c g
 Terepsalta Moulds, 2012 c g
 Terpnosia Distant, 1892 c g
 Tettigades Amyot and Audinet-Serville, 1843 i c g
 Tettigetta Kolenati, 1857 c g
 Tettigettacula Puissant, 2010 c g
 Tettigettalna Puissant, 2010 c g
 Tettigettula Puissant, 2010 c g
 Tettigomyia Amyot & Audinet-Serville, 1843 c g
 Tettigotoma Torres, 1942 i c g
 Thaumastopsaltria Kirkaldy, 1900 c g
 Thopha Amyot & Audinet-Serville, 1843 c g
 Tibeta Lei & Chou, 1997 c g
 Tibicina Kolenati, 1857 i c g
 Tibicinoides Distant, 1914 i c g
 Torrescada Sanborn & Heath, 2017 c g
 Tosena Amyot & Audinet-Serville, 1843 c g
 Toulgoetalna Boulard, 1982 i c g
 Toxala Moulds, 2012 c g
 Toxopeusella Schmidt, 1926 c g
 Trengganua Moulton, 1923 c g
 Triglena Fieber, 1875 c g
 Trismarcha Karsch, 1891 c g
 Tryella Moulds, 2003 c g
 Tugelana Distant, 1912 c g
 Tympanistalna Boulard, 1982 c g
 Tympanoterpes Stål, 1861 i c g
 Ueana Distant, 1905 c g
 Ugada Distant, 1904 c g
 Uhleroides Distant, 1912 i c g
 Umjaba Distant, 1904 c g
 Unduncus Duffels, 2011 c g
 Unipomponia Lee, 2014 c g
 Urabunana Distant, 1905 c g
 Uradolichos Moulds, 2012 c g
 Vagitanus Distant, 1918 c g
 Vastarena Delorme, 2016 c g
 Venustria Goding & Froggatt, 1904 c g
 Viettealna Boulard, 1980 c g
 Xosopsaltria Kirkaldy, 1904 c g
 Xossarella Boulard, 1980 c g
 Yanga Distant, 1904 c g
 Yezoterpnosia Matsumura, 1917 c g
 Yoyetta Moulds, 2012 c g
 Zammara Amyot and Audinet-Serville, 1843 i c g
 Zammaralna Boulard and Sueur, 1996 i c g
 Zaphsa Lee & Emery, 2014 c g
 Zouga Distant, 1906 c g
† Burmacicada Poinar & Kritsky, 2012 c g
† Camuracicada Moulds, 2018
† Dominicicada Poinar & Kritsky, 2012 c g
† Fonsecacicada Martins-Neto & Mendes, 2002 c g
† Jassus Fabricius, 1803 c g
† Lithocicada Cockerell, 1906 c g
† Minyscapheus Poinar, Kritsky & Brown, 2012 c g
† Miocenoprasia Boulard & Riou, 1999 c g
† Paleopsalta Moulds, 2018
† Paracicadetta Boulard & Nel, 1990 c g
† Tymocicada Becker-Migdisova, 1954 c g

Data sources: i = ITIS, c = Catalogue of Life, g = GBIF, b = Bugguide.net

References

Cicadidae